The Sick-Leaves is the solo project of Eksteen Jacobsz, an alternative rock artist from South Africa. Jacobsz is the songwriter, guitarist, vocalist and bassist for the act.

Early life

Jacobsz grew up in Ermelo, Mpumalanga, South Africa. He started taking piano lessons when he was 11, but stopped after a year. He started playing guitar at boarding school aged 17, initially taught by his roommate, who had a guitar. Today Jacobsz plays guitar right-handed although he is left-handed.

In 2002, after receiving a degree in Investment Management, Jacobsz moved to London. He came into contact with his fellow band members through music ads on Denmark Street, forming a band called The Infidels. The band toured around London for two years with Jacobsz as the vocalist, before his visa ran out and he decided to return to South Africa and start his own project with more control over the songwriting. Jacobsz formed The Sick-Leaves in 2005 after his return from the UK.

Career
Jacobsz's debut album, Tunnel Vision, was recorded in 2005, produced by South African producer Matthew Fink, and released by Sheer Music. In 2007 the album was nominated for a South African Music Award for Best Alternative Album of 2007.

Two singles from Tunnel Vision were play-listed on 5FM: "All these foolish things (I’ve said)" and "Such a Waster", which reached no.11 on the 5FM Top 40. Four singles were submitted to campus radio and all four reached the South African Top 10 chart on Tuks FM and the UJFM Top 20. "All These Foolish Things (I've said)" and "Such a Waster" reached no.1 on the TUKS FM South African Top 10. Tunnel Vision was also nominated for Best Album by the South African skate boarding magazine Blunt at their 2006 Awards.

In June 2008, Jacobsz released his second album Stone the Crow independently, utilising high pitched vocals and layered instrument approach. Singles taken from the album reached top 10 positions in the campus charts, with some making it to no.1. A music video was produced for "The Black Disciples".

In September 2008, The Sick-Leaves recorded a cover of "Missing" by Everything but the Girl, accompanied by a black and white music video, the band's first, which was released in December 2008, and put on rotation on MK, MTV BASE, SABC 1 & 2. The single reached no.1 on regional radio stations Highveld, and KFM's local top ten chart, 'The Homebrew top ten' which is voted by listeners.

In November 2009, The Sick-Leaves commenced recording of the third album, The Last Dance of The Sugar Plum Fairy, at SABC RDF M5 with producer Darryl Torr. Last Dance of The Sugar Plum Fairy consists of eleven original songs, with all instrumentation except for drums tracked by Jacobsz. Drums were performed by Wayne Kennith Pictor. The album was released on 8 March 2010.

The Sick-Leaves performed on 5FM's hour-long live performance show (Live)5 on 30 January, and held a media launch of the album in association with Jose Cuervo on Wednesday 24 November at a venue called Narina Trogon in Johannesburg, which included interviews for MK, youth TV channel Vuzu, and ETV's Showbiz Report amongst other radio and print media.

In January 2011, The Sick-Leaves commenced recording of the fourth album, Breaking Away, at SABC RDF M5 with producer Darryl Torr. Breaking Away consists of eight original songs with all instrumentation except for drums again tracked by Jacobsz. Pictor again provided the drum track. Overdubbing of guitars were tracked with Matthew Fink, who also acted as producer. The album was released on 23 January 2012.
Muse Online magazine described the album as the band's "best to date".

The Sick-Leaves commenced writing and recording for the fifth album, Travels with Charlie, in March 2013. The album consists of 11 original songs with all instrumentation except for drums tracked by Jacobsz, who also produced the album himself for the first time, and Pictor returning as drummer. The album was recorded in various bedrooms, basements and sheds. The drums were recorded at Openroom Studios, Johannesburg. The album was mixed in Chicago, United States by Matt Dougherty and mastered in Johannesburg by Rogan Kelsey. The album was released on 27 June 2017. Skyways Magazine said that the album "requires repeated listens", and the Captain, my Captain music blog named the album as Jacobsz's best.

Style
According to bizcommunity.com, "Jacobsz has a distinctive guitar style which is heard on all four released albums with The Sick-Leaves sound being described as classic guitar driven rock & roll with high pitched vocals and strong bass lines"

Awards and recognition
Both Tunnel Vision and Stone The Crow were nominated for SA Music Awards in the category of "Best Alternative Album: English", in the years 2007 and 2009 respectively. The music video for "All These Foolish Things (I've said)" was nominated in 2010 for a MK Award in the category of Best Animated Music video SFX.

Blunt magazine nominated The Sick-Leaves for a Blunt Award for Best Rock Album in 2007.

Discography

Tunnel Vision (2006)
track listing:
 Coffee Break
 Kiss and Tell
 Tunnel Vision
 All these foolish things (I’ve said)
 Across the line
 Short Skirts
 Such a Waster
 The Usual Favours
 To Below and Above
 Tell you all
 Par Avion
 Overkill
 Do
 Articles from the Archives
Stone the Crow (2008)
track listing:
 I'll Follow You
 Valley Of The Dolls
 Kaizen
 Phantom Pain
 Foggy
 The Familiar Departed
 The Black Disciples
 Coppice Fire
 Lock ‘n Load
 Scotoma (Seein’ Ain’t Believin’)
 Hustle Honey
 Uncovered
 Torpedoed Lifeboat
Last Dance of the Sugar Plum Fairy (2010)
track listing
 All you want
 What are you waiting for?
 Coz you like it
 Run away
 Move faster than this
 Heartland
 K2
 Tell it like it is
 The Geisha Puppets
 Come & Go
 From where you came
Breaking Away (2012)
track listing
 The Other Way
 I Know Your Name
 Fanning The Flames
 Breaking Away
 Catfights In Bushes
 No Doubt About It
 Not Unlike You
 They Died With Their Boots On
Travels with Charlie (2017)
track listing
 Shoot the messenger
 Six inch valley (a.k.a. Cancer)
 (I've got) All the time in the world
 Underneath it all
 Sins of the city
 Adrift
 A silver lining
 She ain't here
 Jacqualine
 What a life
 I'll wait for you

Covers
 "Missing" by Everything But The Girl (released September 2008)
 "Crying" by Roy Orbison (released April 2011)

References

External links
 Official website of The Sick-Leaves

1979 births
Living people
People from Ermelo, Mpumalanga
South African rock musicians
South African indie rock groups